The Scarlet Empress is an original novel written by Paul Magrs and based on the long-running British science fiction television series Doctor Who. It features the Eighth Doctor, Sam and Iris Wildthyme.

Synopsis

On the ancient planet of Hyspero, a world where magic still exists, the Doctor reads tales from the Aja’ib, a strange book full of peculiar adventure stories, while Sam goes exploring and meets an alligator skinned man, Gila, chained up in a double-decker London bus. Using the bus to come to her rescue, the Doctor and Sam are soon caught up in a struggle for survival alongside Iris Wildthyme, a fellow time-traveller, the owner of the double decker bus, a serving Conservative MP, and - possibly - a fellow Time Lord.

Iris claims to be on a mission for the current Scarlet Empress, but the Doctor suspects she has ulterior motives.  However, the planet has suffered under the rule of the Scarlet Empresses for thousands of years and so the Doctor and Sam embark on a perilous journey across Hyspero to discover the truth.

Critical response

TV Zone called the book 'a brilliantly provocative, lyrical and mature Doctor Who novel'.

References

External links
The Cloister Library - The Scarlet Empress

Reviews
The Whoniverse's review on The Scarlet Empress

1998 British novels
1998 science fiction novels
Eighth Doctor Adventures
British science fiction novels
Novels by Paul Magrs